The state of Minas Gerais, in Brazil, has 13 intermediate geographic regions. They are divided in 70 immediate geographic regions according to IBGE (2017).

Intermediate Geographic Region of Belo Horizonte 
The Intermediate Geographic Region of Belo Horizonte has 74 municipalities, distributed in 5 immediate geographic regions.

 Immediate Geographic Region of Belo Horizonte: 29 municipalities.
 Immediate Geographic Region of Curvelo: 11 municipalities.
 Immediate Geographic Region of Itabira: 9 municipalities.
 Immediate Geographic Region of Santa Bárbara-Ouro Preto: 6 municipalities.
 Immediate Geographic Region of Sete Lagoas: 19 municipalities.

Intermediate Geographic Region of Montes Claros 
The Intermediate Geographic Region of Montes Claros has 87 municipalities, distributed in 7 immediate geographic regions.

 Immediate Geographic Region of Montes Claros: 32 municipalities
 Immediate Geographic Region of Janaúba: 11 municipalities
 Immediate Geographic Region of Januária: 8 municipalities
 Immediate Geographic Region of Espinosa: 8 municipalities
 Immediate Geographic Region of Salinas: 14 municipalities
 Immediate Geographic Region of Pirapora: 7 municipalities
 Immediate Geographic Region of São Francisco: 6 municipalities.

Intermediate Geographic Region of Teófilo Otoni 
The Intermediate Geographic Region of Teófilo Otoni has 86 municipalities, distributed in 7 immediate geographic regions.

 Immediate Geographic Region of Teófilo Otoni: 27 municipalities.
 Immediate Geographic Region of Almenara: 14 municipalities.
 Immediate Geographic Region of Pedra Azul: 7 municipalities.
 Immediate Geographic Region of Araçuaí: 8 municipalities.
 Immediate Geographic Region of Capelinha: 10 municipalities.
 Immediate Geographic Region of Águas Formosas: 7 municipalities.

 Immediate Geographic Region of Diamantina: 13 municipalities.

Intermediate Geographic Region of Governador Valadares 
The Intermediate Geographic Region of Governador Valadares has 58 municipalities, distributed in 4 immediate geographic regions.

 Immediate Geographic Region of Governador Valadares: 26 municipalities.

 Immediate Geographic Region of Guanhães: 20 municipalities.
 Immediate Geographic Region of Mantena: 7 municipalities.
 Immediate Geographic Region of Aimorés-Resplendor: 5 municipalities.

Intermediate Geographic Region of Ipatinga 
The Intermediate Geographic Region of Ipatinga has 44 municipalities, distributed in 3 immediate geographic regions.

 Immediate Geographic Region of Ipatinga: 22 municipalities.
 Immediate Geographic Region of Caratinga: 16 municipalities.
 Immediate Geographic Region of João Monlevade: 6 municipalities.

Intermediate Geographic Region of Juiz de Fora 
The Intermediate Geographic Region of Juiz de Fora has 146 municipalities, distributed in 10 immediate geographic regions.

 Immediate Geographic Region of Juiz de Fora: 29 municipalities.
 Immediate Geographic Region of Ubá: 17 municipalities.
 Immediate Geographic Region of Muriaé: 12 municipalities.
 Immediate Geographic Region of Viçosa: 12 municipalities.
 Immediate Geographic Region of Carangola: 9 municipalities.

 Immediate Geographic Region of Cataguases: 10 municipalities.
 Immediate Geographic Region of São João Nepomuceno-Bicas: 9 municipalities.

 Immediate Geographic Region of Ponte Nova: 19 municipalities.
 Immediate Geographic Region of Além Paraíba: 5 municipalities.
 Immediate Geographic Region of Manhuaçu: 24 municipalities.

Intermediate Geographic Region of Barbacena 
The Intermediate Geographic Region of Barbacena has 49 municipalities, distributed in 3 immediate geographic regions.

 Immediate Geographic Region of Barbacena: 14 municipalities.

 Immediate Geographic Region of Conselheiro Lafaiete: 21 municipalities.
 Immediate Geographic Region of São João del-Rei: 14 municipalities.

Intermediate Geographic Region of Varginha 
The Intermediate Geographic Region of Varginha has 82 municipalities, distributed in 10 immediate geographic regions.

 Immediate Geographic Region of Varginha: 5 municipalities.
 Immediate Geographic Region of Lavras: 14 municipalities.
 Immediate Geographic Region of Alfenas: 13 municipalities.
 Immediate Geographic Region of Três Corações: 6 municipalities.
 Immediate Geographic Region of São Sebastião do Paraíso: 5 municipalities.
 Immediate Geographic Region of Campo Belo: 5 municipalities.
 Immediate Geographic Region of Guaxupé: 9 municipalities.
 Immediate Geographic Region of Passos: 15 municipalities.
 Immediate Geographic Region of Piumhi: 5 municipalities.
 Immediate Geographic Region of Três Pontas-Boa Esperança: 5 municipalities.

Intermediate Geographic Region of Pouso Alegre 
The Intermediate Geographic Region of Pouso Alegre has 80 municipalities, distributed in 5 immediate geographic regions.

 Immediate Geographic Region of Pouso Alegre: 34 municipalities.
 Immediate Geographic Region of São Lourenço: 16 municipalities.
 Immediate Geographic Region of Poços de Caldas: 8 municipalities.
 Immediate Geographic Region of Itajubá: 14 municipalities.
 Immediate Geographic Region of Caxambu-Baependi: 8 municipalities.

Intermediate Geographic Region of Uberaba 
The Intermediate Geographic Region of Uberaba has 29 municipalities, distributed in 4 immediate geographic regions.

 Immediate Geographic Region of Uberaba: 10 municipalities.
 Immediate Geographic Region of Araxá: 8 municipalities.
 Immediate Geographic Region of Frutal: 6 municipalities.
 Immediate Geographic Region of Iturama: 5 municipalities.

Intermediate Geographic Region of Uberlândia 
The Intermediate Geographic Region of Uberlândia has 24 municipalities, distributed in 3 immediate geographic regions.

 Immediate Geographic Region of Uberlândia: 11 municipalities.
 Immediate Geographic Region of Ituiutaba: 6 municipalities.
 Immediate Geographic Region of Monte Carmelo: 7 municipalities.

Intermediate Geographic Region of Patos de Minas 
The Intermediate Geographic Region of Patos de Minas has 34 municipalities, distributed in 3 immediate geographic regions.

 Immediate Geographic Region of Patos de Minas: 18 municipalities.
 Immediate Geographic Region of Unaí: 11 municipalities.
 Immediate Geographic Region of Patrocínio: 5 municipalities.

Intermediate Geographic Region of Divinópolis 
The Intermediate Geographic Region of Divinópolis has 61 municipalities, distributed in 6 immediate geographic regions.

 Immediate Geographic Region of Divinópolis: 20 municipalities.
 Immediate Geographic Region of Abaeté: 5 municipalities.
 Immediate Geographic Region of Pará de Minas: 7 municipalities.
 Immediate Geographic Region of Formiga: 10 municipalities.
 Immediate Geographic Region of Oliveira: 10 municipalities.
 Immediate Geographic Region of Dores do Indaiá: 9 municipalities.

References 

Geography of Minas Gerais